Robert Galataud was a French boxer. He competed in the men's welterweight event at the 1928 Summer Olympics.

1928 Olympic results
 Round of 32: bye
 Round of 16: defeated Frantisek Nekolny (Czechoslovakia) on points
 Quarterfinal: defeated Johan Hellstrom (Finland) on points
 Semifinal: lost to Ted Morgan (New Zealand) on points
 Bronze Medal Bout: lost to Raymond Smillie (Canada) on points

References

External links
  

Year of birth missing
Possibly living people
French male boxers
Olympic boxers of France
Boxers at the 1928 Summer Olympics
Place of birth missing
Welterweight boxers